Bhavabhūti (Devanagari: भवभूति) was an 8th-century scholar of India noted for his plays and poetry, written in Sanskrit. His plays are considered the equal of the works of Kalidasa. Bhavabhuti was born in Padmapura, Vidarbha, in Gondia district, on Maharashtra and Madhya Pradesh border. He was born in a Deshastha Brahmin family of scholars.
His real name was Srikantha Nilakantha, and he was the son of Nilakantha and Jatukarni. He received his education at 'Padmapawaya', a place some 42 km South-West of Gwalior.
Dayananidhi Paramahansa is known to be his guru. He composed his historical plays at 'Kalpi', a place on banks of river Yamuna.

He is believed to have been the court poet of king Yashovarman of Kannauj. Kalhana, the 12th-century historian, places him in the entourage of the king, who was defeated by Lalitaditya Muktapida, king of Kashmir, in 736 AD.

Malatimadhava

The play is set in the city of Padmavati. The king desires that his minister's daughter Malati marry a youth called Nandana. Malati is in love with Madhava ever since she saw him and drew his portrait. Madhava reciprocates, and draws a portrait of her in turn. Malati suspects her father's motives in falling in with the King's plans for her. A side plot involves the lovers' friends Makaranda and Madayantika. The latter is attacked by a tiger, and Makaranda rescues her, getting wounded in the process. After numerous travails, all ends well, with the two couples uniting. According to the renowned Sanskritist Daniel H.H. Ingalls, the Malatimadhava is a work that combines love and horror with a felicity never again equaled in Sanskrit literature.

Indebtedness to Kautilya and Arthashastra
According to Dasharatha Sharma, the dramatists Kalidasa and Bhavabhuti utilized the Arthashastra of Kautilya while composing their famous works. Kalidasa is indebted to Kautilya's Arthashastra for material in the Raghuvamsa. Similarly, Bhavabhuti utilizes words and ideas from the Arthashastra in the Malatimadhava and the Mahaviracharita. There is indeed a striking resemblance between the methods advocated by  Ravana's minister, Malayavana  and the policies suggested by Kautilya in the Arthashastra.

Legacy
Late Laxmanrao Mankar Guruji named his education society as "Bhavbhuti Education Society" in 1950.
Yashodabai Rahile founded "Bhavbhuti Mandal" (community) in 1996. Historian Mr O.C. Patle published a book "Bhavbhuti ab geeton mein" (Bhavbhuti, now in his songs), he also has published some audio CDs and cassettes to keep the legend's memories alive. State's local TV channel, Sayhyadri and E TV Marathi telecasts some documentaries on the life of this great poet. People and some non profit groups have erected a few statues in the region where the poet belongs to.

Works

 Mahaviracharita (The story of the highly courageous one), depicting the early life of Rama
 Malatimadhava, a play based on the romance of Malati and Madhava
 Uttararamacarita (The story of Rama's later life), depicts Rama's coronation, the abandonment of Sita, and their reunion

References

External links
 Malati and Madhava, translated by Horace Hayman Wilson
The Uttara Rama Charita of Bhavabhuti. With Sanskrit commentary by Pandit Bhatji Shastri Ghate of Nagpur and a close English translation by Vinayak Sadashiv Patvardhan. The Nyaya Sudha Press, Nagpur 1895 
Rama's later history or Uttara-Ram-Charita of Bhavabhuti. Critically edited with notes and an English transltation by Shripad Krishna Belvalkar. Harvard University Press 1915 

Hindu poets
8th-century Indian poets
Ancient Indian dramatists and playwrights
Kalidas
Kalidas
Date of birth unknown
Date of death unknown
Indian male poets
Indian male dramatists and playwrights